Frankie Gavin may refer to:

 Frankie Gavin (musician) (born 1956), fiddle player of traditional Irish music
 Frankie Gavin (boxer) (born 1985), British boxer